Jab We Matched is an Indian anthology streaming television series written by Raj Routh which premiered on 10 February 2023 on Amazon miniTV. The series features four stand-alone episodes directed by Srinivas Sunderrajan and stars Jasmin Bhasin, Priyank Sharma, Mayur More, Abhishek Nigam, Shivangi Joshi, Prit Kamani and Revathi Pillai.

Cast
 Jasmin Bhasin
 Priyank Sharma
 Mayur More
 Abhishek Nigam
 Shivangi Joshi
 Prit Kamani
 Revathi Pillai

Production
The series was announced by Sharanya Rajgopal on Amazon miniTV consisting of four episodes. Abhishek Nigam, Priyank Sharma, Mayur More, Prit Kamani, Shivangi Joshi, Jasmin Bhasin and Revathi Pillai were cast to appear in the series.

The trailer of the series was released in February 2023 featuring Jasmin Bhasin, who's playing the role of a sweet girl and meets a guy through a dating app.

Episodes

Reception 
Archika Khurana of The Times of India rated the series 3.9/5 and wrote "Jab We Matched' has enough drama, surprises, and convincing performances to make this dating experience worthwhile."

A reviewer for Bollywood Tadka gave 3.5 stars out of 5 praising the performance of Jasmin.

References

External links
 
 

 

2023 Indian television series debuts
2020s Indian television series
Indian anthology television series